Khoroshayevo is a rural locality (a village) in Uryush-Bittulinsky Selsoviet, Karaidelsky District, Bashkortostan, Russia. The population was 20 as of 2010. There are 6 streets.

Geography 
Khoroshayevo is located 53 km southwest of Karaidel (the district's administrative centre) by road. Atamanovka is the nearest rural locality.

References 

Rural localities in Karaidelsky District